In mathematics, particularly functional analysis, James' theorem, named for Robert C. James, states that a Banach space  is reflexive if and only if every continuous linear functional's norm on  attains its supremum on the closed unit ball in 

A stronger version of the theorem states that a weakly closed subset  of a Banach space  is weakly compact if and only if the dual norm each continuous linear functional on  attains a maximum on 

The hypothesis of completeness in the theorem cannot be dropped.

Statements

The space  considered can be a real or complex Banach space.

A Banach space being reflexive if and only if its closed unit ball is weakly compact one deduces from this, since the norm of a continuous linear form is the upper bound of its module on this ball:

History

Historically, these sentences were proved in reverse order. In 1957, James had proved the reflexivity criterion for separable Banach spaces and 1964 for general Banach spaces. Since the reflexivity is equivalent to the weak compactness of the unit sphere, Victor L. Klee reformulated this as a compactness criterion for the unit sphere in 1962 and assumes that this criterion characterizes any weakly compact quantities. This was then actually proved by James in 1964.

See also

Notes

References

 
 .
 .
 .
 .
 

Theorems in functional analysis